A mystery film is a genre of film revolving around the solution to a problem or a crime. It focuses on the efforts of a protagonist to solve the mystery by means of clues, investigation, and deduction.

This is a list of mystery films by decade.

1910s

1920s

1930s

1940s

1950s

1960s

1970s

1980s

1990s

2000s

2010s

2020s

Footnotes

Mystery films